Angela Russell (born 2 March 1967) is a former Australian freestyle swimmer. She competed in three events at the 1984 Summer Olympics.

References

External links
 

1967 births
Living people
Australian female freestyle swimmers
Olympic swimmers of Australia
Swimmers at the 1984 Summer Olympics
Place of birth missing (living people)
Swimmers at the 1982 Commonwealth Games
Swimmers at the 1986 Commonwealth Games
Commonwealth Games silver medallists for Australia
Commonwealth Games bronze medallists for Australia
Commonwealth Games medallists in swimming
20th-century Australian women
Medallists at the 1982 Commonwealth Games
Medallists at the 1986 Commonwealth Games